Badin Zai Dam (بادین زئی ڈیم) is a proposed dam to be built across Zhob River located in Zhob District, Balochistan, Pakistan.

References

Dams in Pakistan
Hydroelectric power stations in Pakistan
Zhob District
Dams in Balochistan, Pakistan